This is the list of äkıms of Qyzylorda Region that have held the position since 1992.

List of Äkıms 

 Seiılbek Şauhamanov (10 February 1992 – 29 September 1995)
 Berdıbek Saparbaev (29 September 1995 – 26 July 1999)
 Serıkbai Nūrğisaev (26 July 1999 – 5 April 2004)
 İkram Adyrbekov (5 April 2004 – 11 January 2007)
 Mūhtar Qūl-Mūhammed (11 January 2007 – 12 May 2008)
 Bolatbek Quandyqov (12 May 2008 – 16 January 2013)
 Qyrymbek Köşerbaev (17 January 2013 – 28 June 2019)
 Quanyşbek Ysqaqov (28 June 2019 – 28 March 2020)
 Gülşara Äbdıqalyqova (28 March 2020 – present)

References 

Government of Kazakhstan